Werner A. Baum was the 2nd chancellor of University of Wisconsin–Milwaukee (1973-1979) and the 7th president of University of Rhode Island (1968-1973).

Before becoming the president of University of Rhode Island, he had been the deputy administrator of the Environmental Science Services in the U.S. Department of Commerce, vice president for scientific affairs at New York University, vice president for academic affairs and dean of the faculties at the University of Miami and earlier as dean of the Graduate School and dean of the faculties at Florida State University. He returned as dean of the College of Art and Sciences at Florida State University from 1979-1990.

Baum obtained his M.S. and Ph.D. from University of Chicago.

References

Chancellors of the University of Wisconsin-Milwaukee
University of Chicago alumni
University of Rhode Island faculty
New York University faculty
University of Miami people
Florida State University faculty
Presidents of the University of Rhode Island